The three dowitchers  are medium-sized long-billed wading birds in  the genus Limnodromus.  The English name "dowitcher" is from Iroquois, recorded in English by the 1830s.

They resemble godwits in body and bill shape, and the reddish underparts in summer, but are much shorter legged, more like snipe to which they are also somewhat more closely related. All three are strongly migratory.

The two North American species are difficult to separate in most plumages, and were considered a single species for many years. The Asian bird is rare and not well known.

Taxonomy
The genus Limnodromus was introduced in 1833 by the German naturalist Prince Maximilian of Wied-Neuwied to accommodate a single species, the short-billed dowitcher. The name combines the Ancient Greek limnē meaning "marsh" with -dromos meaning "-racer" or "-runner".

The dowitcher species are:
 Short-billed dowitcher, Limnodromus griseus
 Long-billed dowitcher, Limnodromus scolopaceus
 Asian dowitcher, Limnodromus semipalmatus

References

External links
 

Bird genera